Strutton is a surname of English origin, being a variant of the surname Stratton. Notable people with the surname include:

Benjamin Strutton (1892-1968), English cricketer
Bill Strutton (1918-2003), Australian screenwriter and novelist
Charlie Strutton (born 1989), English professional footballer
Edith Munnings (1867-1939), later known as Edith Strutton, New Zealand artist and missionary

See also
Strutton Ground Market, a street market near Victoria, London
Strutton Islands, an island group in Nunavut, Canada
Stratton (surname)